Kishan Chand Tyagi (born 10 December 1950) is an Indian politician who is a former member of the Rajya Sabha (the upper house of Indian Parliament) representing the state of Bihar and serves as the Chief General Secretary and National Spokesperson of the Janata Dal (United). He was also the Chairman of the Parliamentary standing committee on The Industry.

He was a member of the Ninth Lok Sabha and has served as the Chairman of the Committee on Papers Laid on the Table and as the Chairman of Central Warehousing Corporation.

Early life 
Kishan Chand Tyagi was born in a farming family in the village of Morta in the Ghaziabad district of the Indian state of Uttar Pradesh. His father was Jagram Singh Tyagi and mother Rohtash Tyagi. He has done his schooling from Muradnagar town of Ghaziabad. He was awarded a B.SC. degree from Meerut University.

References

External links 
 Profile on Lok Sabha Website

1950 births
Living people
India MPs 1989–1991
Janata Dal (United) politicians
People from Ghaziabad, Uttar Pradesh
Lok Sabha members from Uttar Pradesh
Rajya Sabha members from Bihar
Janata Dal politicians
Samajwadi Party politicians
Janata Party politicians
Bharatiya Lok Dal politicians
People from Hapur district